Alfredo Guzzoni (12 April 1877 – 15 April 1965) was an Italian military officer who served in both World War I and World War II.

Early life
Guzzoni was a native of Mantua, Italy.

Italian Army
Guzzoni joined the Italian Royal Army (Regio Esercito Italiano) and fought in World War I.

After the Second Italo-Abyssinian War, Guzzoni was appointed Governor of Eritrea. He served as governor from May 1936 until April 1937.

In 1939, Guzzoni had a prominent role in the Italian invasion of Albania and was Commander-in-Chief of the Higher Forces Command Albania in 1940.

In June 1940, after Italy entered World War II, Guzzoni commanded the Italian 4th Army during the invasion of France.

On 29 November 1940, Guzzoni succeeded Ubaldo Soddu as Under-Secretary of War and Deputy Chief of the Supreme General Staff.

In 1943, Guzzoni was General Officer Commanding the 6th Army on Sicily and commander of the Axis troops on Sicily during the Allied invasion of the island. The German-Italian resistance lasted 37 days before the evacuation of the island.

Armistice and prosecution
After the Italian armistice of September 1943, fascist republican soldiers captured general Guzzoni, but he avoided execution thanks to the help of some German officers who appreciated his role during the defense of Sicily.

See also
 Albania under Italy
 Allied invasion of Sicily
 Armistice between Italy and Allied armed forces
 Army Group Liguria
 Eritrea Governorate

External links

http://www.generals.dk/general/Guzzoni/Alfredo/Italy.html
 

1877 births
1965 deaths
Military personnel from Mantua
Italian generals
History of Eritrea
People of former Italian colonies
Italian protectorate of Albania (1939–1943)
Italian military personnel of World War I
Italian military personnel of the Second Italo-Ethiopian War
Italian military personnel of World War II